The Matgue River is a river in the United States territory of Guam. It gives its name to the NRHP-listed Matgue River Valley Battle Area of the 1944 Battle of Guam.

See also
List of rivers of Guam

References

Rivers of Guam